Kabeiro is a genus of dendronotid nudibranch in the family Dotidae.

Species
Species within the genus Kabeiro include:

 Kabeiro christianae Shipman & Gosliner, 2015
 Kabeiro phasmida Shipman & Gosliner, 2015
 Kabeiro rubroreticulata Shipman & Gosliner, 2015

References

External links

Dotidae